A water-activated battery is a disposable reserve battery that does not contain an electrolyte and hence produces no voltage until it is soaked in water for several minutes.

Description

Typically, a large variety of aqueous solutions can be used in place of plain water. This battery type is specifically designed to pollute less (see environmentally friendly claims) due to the lesser use or the absence of heavy metals. Water-activated batteries have been used in radiosondes that shouldn't contain heavy metals since they regularly fall to the ground or ocean surface, and indefinitely remain there.

Kits using copper-magnesium cells activated by water or the liquid sample itself are also in development. Another water-activated battery had been invented by Susumu Suzuki of Total System Conductor. Aluminium anodes are used on many water-activated batteries designed for use with salt water such as seawater. The HydroPak uses water-activated disposable fuel cartridges as an alternative to lead acid battery packs and portable generators. It uses water added to sodium borohydride which releases hydrogen fuel for a proton exchange membrane fuel cell. It can be re-charged simply by replacing the fuel cartridge rather than the lengthy recharging that other batteries require, however the cartridges cost $20 each.

See also
 List of battery types
 Lemon battery
 Earth battery
Seawater-activated battery

References

Battery types
Disposable batteries